Holcombe Ward (November 23, 1878 – January 23, 1967) was an American tennis player who was active during the last years of the 19th century and the first decade of the 20th. He won the U.S. National Championships singles title in 1904 and additionally won six doubles titles at the Grand Slam event.

Biography
Ward is best remembered for winning the men's singles title at the U.S. National Championships in 1904 after defeating William Clothier in straight sets in the all-comer's final.  He graduated from Harvard University.

In 1905 Ward won the London Grass Court Championships, now known as Queen's Club Championships, after a walkover in the final against compatriot Beals Wright.

Ward was a member of the USA Davis Cup Team in 1900, 1902, 1905 and 1906. In 1900 and 1902 he played the doubles match in the challenge round which the US team won against the British Isles. In total Ward played 14 Davis Cup matches in seven ties and compiled a 7–7 win–loss record.

After his active career Ward became President of the USLTA (U.S. Lawn Tennis Association) from 1937 to 1947.

Grand Slam finals

Singles: 2 (1 title, 1 runner-up)

Doubles: 9 (6 titles, 3 runners-up)

References

External links 
 
 
 

1878 births
1967 deaths
19th-century American people
19th-century male tennis players
American male tennis players
Sportspeople from New York City
International Tennis Hall of Fame inductees
Tennis people from New York (state)
United States National champions (tennis)
Grand Slam (tennis) champions in men's singles
Grand Slam (tennis) champions in men's doubles
Harvard Crimson men's tennis players